Georges-Arthur Goldschmidt (born 2 May 1928) is a French writer and translator of German origin.

Biography 
Georges-Arthur Goldschmidt was born in Reinbek near Hamburg, into a Jewish family of magistrates converted to Protestantism. 

His father was an adviser to the Hamburg Court of Appeal until 1933. He was then deported to Theresienstadt where he served as Protestant pastor of "Protestant Jews" deported because of their origin. 

Georges-Arthur fled Germany in 1938. He took refuge in Italy with his brother, then in France, in a boarding school in Megève. From 1943 to September 1944, he was hidden in Haute-Savoie among farmers, particularly François and Olga Allard, who were honoured on August 6, 2012 as Righteous Among the Nations. 

Goldschmidt obtained French nationality in 1949. He was a professor ("agrégé d’allemand") until 1992. He taught at Lycée Paul Eluard for 19 years.

A writer and essayist, Goldschmidt  chose French as a language of expression and writing, without abandoning German. He is a translator, among others, of Walter Benjamin, Friedrich Nietzsche, Franz Kafka and Peter Handke.

Prizes and distinctions 
 1991: Preis der SWR-Bestenliste
 1991: 
 1991: Geschwister-Scholl-Preis (for Die Absonderung)
 1993: Literaturpreis der Stadt Bremen
 1996: 
 1997: Doctor honoris causa of the University of Osnabrück
 1999: Ludwig-Börne-Preis
 2001: Nelly Sachs Prize of the city of Dortmund
 2002: Goethe-Medaille
 2004: Prix France Culture (for Le Poing dans la bouche)
 2005: Joseph-Breitbach-Preis.
 2007: Erlanger Literaturpreis für Poesie als Übersetzung
 2007: The programme for young literary translators of the Franco-German Youth Office (FGYO) and the Frankfurt Book Fair is named after him "Goldschmidt Programme"
 2013: 
 2015: Sigmund-Freud-Kulturpreis

Works 
2015: Les Collines de Belleville. Actes Sud.
2013: Heidegger et la langue allemande, series "Classiques des sciences sociales", UQAC.
2013: La Joie du passeur, CNRS
2011: L'Esprit de retour, Éditions du Seuil
2009: A l'insu de Babel, CNRS Éditions
2009: Une langue pour abri, Créaphis/Facim
2008: Un enfant aux cheveux gris, CNRS Éditions
2007: Celui qu’on cherche habite juste à côté, 
2005: Le Recours, Verdier
2004: Le Poing dans la bouche, Verdier
2001: En présence du Dieu absent, Bayard
1988: Quand Freud voit la mer, 
1999: La Traversée des fleuves, Seuil
1997: Molière ou La liberté mise à nu, Éditions Circé
1997: La Matière de l’écriture, Circé
1996: Quand Freud attend le verbe, Buchet/Chastel
1991: La Forêt interrompue, Seuil
1988: Peter Handke, Seuil
1986: Un Jardin en Allemagne, Seuil
1978: Jean-Jacques Rousseau ou L'esprit de solitude, Éditions Phébus
1973: Molière ou La liberté mise à nu, Éditions Julliard
1971: Le Fidibus, Julliard
1971: Un corps dérisoire, Julliard
1967: Marcel Béalu : un cas de flagrant délit, Le Terrain Vague

Translations

Walter Benjamin 
 Allemands, 2012.

Georg Büchner 
 Lenz, Éditions Vagabonde.

Franz Kafka 
 Le Procès, Press Pocket, 1974.
 Le Château, Press Pocket, 1976.

Peter Handke 
 Bienvenue au conseil d'administration
 La courte lettre pour un long adieu
 Après midi d'un écrivain, Éditions Gallimard, 1987.
 L'heure de la sensation vraie (adapted to cinema in 1988 by Didier Goldschmidt under the title )
 La femme gauchère
 Le poids du monde
 Les gens déraisonnables sont en voie de disparition
 Par les villages
 Encore une fois pour Thucydide, Bourgois, 1996.
 Essai sur la fatigue, Gallimard, 1998.
 Histoire d'enfant, Gallimard, 2001.
 Par une nuit obscure je sortis de ma maison tranquille, Gallimard, 2001.
 Lucie dans la forêt avec les truc-machins, Gallimard, 2001.

Nietzsche 
 Ainsi parlait Zarathoustra, LGF, 1983.

Adalbert Stifter 
 L'Homme sans postérité, Phébus, Libretto, 1978

Studies  
 Life, work, individual aspects
 Heinz Ludwig Arnold, Georges-Arthur Goldschmidt 
 Roger-Yves Roche, Photofictions - Perec, Modiano, Duras, Goldschmidt, Barthes
 Wolfgang Asholt (Hrsg.): Studien zum Werk von Georges-Arthur Goldschmidt. Osnabrück 1999.
 Klaus Bonn: Zur Topik von Haus, Garten und Wald, Meer. Georges-Arthur Goldschmidt. Bielefeld 2003, .
 Michaela Holdenried: Das Ende der Aufrichtigkeit? Zum Wandel autobiographischer Dispositive am Beispiel von Georges-Arthur Goldschmidt. In: Archiv für das Studium der neueren Sprachen und Literaturen. 149. Jg. (1997), Bd. 234, H. 1, pp. 1–19.
 : Wohnen zwischen den Sprachen: Der deutsch-französische Autor Georges-Arthur Goldschmidt. Einführung in Leben und Werk. In: Französische Gegenwartsliteratur (= Begegnungen mit dem Nachbarn. Band 3). Konrad-Adenauer-Stiftung, Sankt Augustin 2004, pp. 127–137 (Kurzfassung online; PDF-Datei, 39 KB).
 Tim Trzaskalik: Gegensprachen. Das Gedächtnis der Texte. Georges-Arthur Goldschmidt. Frankfurt 2007, .
 Georges-Arthur Goldschmidt (= Text+Kritik. H. 181). edition text + kritik, München 2009, .
 Renate Göllner: Masochismus und Befreiung: Georges-Arthur Goldschmit.In: Gerhard Scheit, Manfred Dahlmann (Hrsg.): sans phrase Zeitschrift für Ideologiekritik. Heft 8, Frühjahr 2016. ça ira, Freiburg/Wien, 2016, pp. 180–191

 Interviews
 Gero von Boehm: Georges-Arthur Goldschmidt. 6. Juni 2002. Interview in: Begegnungen. Menschenbilder aus drei Jahrzehnten. Collection Rolf Heyne, München 2012, pp. 298–306.

References

External links 
 Georges-Arthur Goldschmidt sur le site des éditions Verdier
 
 Artikel von Georges-Arthur Goldschmidt: Wozu Negationismus? on the website of the 
 Georges-Arthur Goldschmidt on the site of France Culture
 Georges-Arthur Goldschmidt and Paul Rauchs on YouTube

20th-century French non-fiction writers
21st-century French non-fiction writers
Jewish emigrants from Nazi Germany to France
German–French translators
Holocaust survivors
Prix France Culture winners
French literary critics
Commandeurs of the Ordre des Arts et des Lettres
1928 births
People from Stormarn (district)
Living people
Translators of Friedrich Nietzsche